Jordan Kerr and David Škoch were the defending champions. They were both present but did not compete together.
Kerr partnered with František Čermák, but lost in the first round to Guillermo Coria and Jean-Julien Rojer.
Skoch partnered with Jaroslav Levinský, but lost in the quarterfinals to Florian Mayer and Rainer Schüttler.

Albert Montañés and Santiago Ventura won in the final 6–1, 6–2, against James Cerretani and Todd Perry.

Seeds

Draw

Draw

External links
 [* Doubles draw Draw]

Doubles